David Barakau Wesley (born November 14, 1970) is an American former professional basketball player who played in the National Basketball Association (NBA). He is the current television color analyst for the New Orleans Pelicans. He is the cousin of former NBA player Michael Dickerson.

Early life
David graduated from Longview High School in Longview, Texas. He was classmates with former NFL player Bobby Taylor.

College career 
Wesley played his freshman year at Temple Junior College, then transferred to Baylor University.  Wesley averaged 17 points per game and 4.4 assists per game in 72 total games at Baylor, and left in 1992, 33 hours short of a degree in physical education.

Professional career

Wichita Falls Texans (1992-1993) 
When Wesley left Baylor University in 1992, many scouts considered him too small (at 6'1") to play as a shooting guard in the NBA, and doubted his ability to make the transition to point guard. As a result, Wesley was not selected in the 1992 NBA draft. He spent the 1992–93 season in the CBA playing for the Wichita Falls Texans.

New Jersey Nets, Boston Celtics, Charlotte/New Orleans Hornets, and Houston Rockets (1993-2006) 
Wesley signed with the New Jersey Nets as a free agent in 1993. He later played for the Boston Celtics, the Charlotte/New Orleans Hornets the Houston Rockets, and the Cleveland Cavaliers. Wesley dispelled the initial doubts about his ability to succeed in the NBA, averaging almost 13 points and 4.6 assists per game over a 14-year career, including ten straight seasons with double-digit scoring averages (1995–96 through 2004–05). He received praise as a tenacious man-to-man defender, and a reliable outside shooter. Wesley played in 55 playoff games and scored double figures in more than half of them.

Cleveland Cavaliers (2006-2007) 
During the 2006–07 season, Wesley only played for 35 games and averaged career-lows of 2.1 points, 1.0 rebounds and 1.1 assists. He also did not play any minutes during the playoffs.

On September 29, 2007, Wesley was traded back to the Hornets for Cedric Simmons.  On October 29, 2007, the New Jersey Nets reacquired guard David Wesley from the New Orleans Hornets for swingman Bernard Robinson, center Mile Ilić and cash considerations. On November 1, 2007, not even a week after the Nets signed him, he was waived. A few days later, Wesley stated he planned on ending his NBA career. His 11,842 career points rank second all-time behind Moses Malone among undrafted NBA players.

Coaching
From 2011–2012, Wesley worked as an assistant coach for the NBA D-League Texas Legends.

Broadcasting
On August 6, 2012, it was announced that Wesley would join the Fox Sports New Orleans team in broadcasting New Orleans Hornets games. (Since then, the team has been renamed the New Orleans Pelicans.) He was hired to be the Pelicans television color analyst.

Personal
David Wesley was charged in 2000 with misdemeanor reckless driving in the crash that killed his friend and teammate Bobby Phills. A Charlotte-Mecklenburg Police report said Phills was speeding at more than  when Phills lost control and crossed into oncoming traffic and collided with a car. The report said both Phills and Wesley were driving "in an erratic, reckless, careless, negligent and/or aggressive manner". In a non-jury trial, a judge acquitted Wesley of the charge of racing Phills.

References

External links 
 David Wesley Profile NBA – David Wesley Player Profile
 

1970 births
Living people
American men's basketball players
Basketball coaches from Texas
Basketball players from San Antonio
Baylor Bears men's basketball players
Boston Celtics players
Charlotte Hornets players
Cleveland Cavaliers players
Houston Rockets players
Junior college men's basketball players in the United States
Longview High School alumni
National Basketball Association broadcasters
New Jersey Nets players
New Orleans Hornets announcers
New Orleans Hornets players
New Orleans Pelicans announcers
People from Longview, Texas
Point guards
Shooting guards
Sportspeople from San Antonio
Texas Legends coaches
Undrafted National Basketball Association players
Wichita Falls Texans players